Glaucocharis novaehebridensis is a moth in the family Crambidae. It was described by David E. Gaskin in 1974. It is found on the New Hebrides in the South Pacific.

References

Diptychophorini
Moths described in 1974
Fauna of Vanuatu